Jan Theuninck (born 7 June 1954) is a Belgian painter and poet. Although born in Zonnebeke, Belgium, and a native speaker of Dutch, he writes in French and occasionally English. His painting is abstract, falling somewhere between minimalism and monochrome expressionism.

As a painter, he has been influenced by Ellsworth Kelly and Joan Miró. His work in both media is guided by his social and political convictions, dealing with topics such as colonialism old and new, mass and society, and pacifism.

External links

 Holocaust by Jan Theuninck on Boekgrrls
Exhibition G20 Summit Conference in Seoul, Korea
Peace Museum, Holland
Charter for Compassion

Belgian painters
Belgian poets in French
Flemish writers
1954 births
Living people